Orange High School may refer to:

Orange High School (Orange, California)
Orange High School (Ohio)
Orange High School (New Jersey)
Orange High School (New South Wales)
Orange High School (North Carolina)
Orange High School (Orange, Virginia), designed by Charles Morrison Robinson and listed on the National Register of Historic Places

Orange High School may also refer to:
West Orange-Cove Consolidated Independent School District, which once had an 'Orange High School.'